Ophioderma pendulum is sometimes known as the old-world adder's-tongue. In Malaysia, it is known as daun rambu. It is a fern in the family Ophioglossaceae, and is the type species of the genus Ophioderma. It is most noteworthy for the length of its pendant fronds,  up to 14 ft 9 in (4.5 meters) in length and three inches (8 cm) wide produced at intervals along a tree-clinging rhizome.

Ophioderma pendulum is a common epiphyte in the East Indies.

Taxonomy
Linnaeus was the first to describe this species with the binomial Ophioglossum pendulum in his Species Plantarum of 1753.

References

Ophioglossaceae